Kathe Burkhart (born 1958, Martinsburg, West Virginia) is an American interdisciplinary artist, painter, writer and art critic. Described as both a conceptual artist and an installation artist, she uses various media in her work, combining collage, digital media, drawing, fiction, installation, nonfiction, painting, photography video, poetry, and sculpture. The content is feminist; the radical female is the subject. The Liz Taylor painting series, which she began painting in 1982, have been exhibited at the MoMA PS1, the Stedelijk Museum, and the Venice Biennale.
Burkhart is also the author of literary fiction and poetry.

The Liz Taylor Series

Burkhart's The Liz Taylor Series (1982-ongoing) is a self-portrait project in which the artist uses the image of Liz Taylor to explore fantasies and evoke the artists genderqueer identity. Stills of Taylor taken from her films are painted in a cartoonish style with profane text imposed on top. Jane Ursula Harris says Burkhart's work embodies: "ribald humor and [a] feminist-punk attitude."  Artist Keith Mayerson has said of Burkhart's series, "Reproduced chronologically, the portraits take on new life as a visual diary, a pictorial narrative in which we witness how women's freedom and spirit have been repressed by male-dominated capitalist culture, with Liz Taylor as our courageous avatar".

Exhibitions

Individual exhibitions 
 1988 Paintings from the Liz Taylor Series, Feature, Chicago, and Greathouse, New York
 1989 Kathe Burkhart by Elizabeth Taylor, Feature, New York
 1991 People in Hell Want Ice Water, Feature, New York  Works on Paper from the Liz Taylor Series, Dennis Anderson Galerie, Antwerp
 1992 Selected Works from the Liz Taylor Series, Shoshana Wayne Gallery, Los Angeles
 1993 Iron Hand in a Velvet Glove, Dennis Anderson Gallery, Antwerp  Velvet Revolution, Galleria in Arco, Turin, Italy  White Room, White Columns, New York
 1994 Ohio State University, Columbus
 1995 Bad, Stelling Gallery, Leiden, Netherlands
 1997 Selected Works, Galerie De Lege Ruimte, Gent, Belgium  Constriction, Cultural Centrum Bruges, Belgium  Selected Works from the Liz Taylor Series 1986–1997,  Serge Sorokko Gallery, New York
 2007 The Liz Taylor Series -- Selections from 1983 - 2007, Alexander Gray Associates, New York, NY.
 2007–2008 Kathe Burkhart MoMA PS1 Contemporary Art Center, New York, NY
 2016 Kathe Burkhart Drawings Fierman, New York, NY

Selected group exhibitions 
 1981 National Small Sculpture & Drawing Exhibition, Westwood Center for the Arts, Los Angeles
 1987 Head Sex, Feature, Chicago
 1990 The Plague Years, Ground Zero, New York  Sex and Language, Garnet Press Gallery, Toronto
 1991 Original Sin, Hillwood Art Museum, Brookville, New York  Painting Culture, fiction/nonfiction, New York
 1992 Tattoo Collection, Air de Paris, Nice, France (traveling)  Ballots or Bullets, Sally Hawkins Gallery, New York  From Media to Metaphor: Art About Aids, Emerson Gallery, Clinton, New York (traveled throughout U.S.)  Beyond Loss: Art in the Era of AIDS, Washington Project for the Arts, Washington D.C.
 1994 Bad Girls West, UCLA Wight Art Gallery, Los Angeles  Medialismo, FlashArt Museum, Trevi, Italy
 1995 Fuori Uso, Caravanserai of Contemporary Art, Pescara, Italy  Alternatives: 20 Years of Hallwalls 1975–95, Burchfield Penney Art Center, Buffalo, New York
 1996 Real Fake, Neuberger Museum of Art, Purchase, New York
 1997 Irredeemable Skeletons, Shillam and Smith, London   The Gaze, Momenta Art, Brooklyn, New York   Cul(t) de Sac(re), Art Kitchen, Amsterdam   Autoportrait, Exit Art, New York   Cool It, Art Kitchen, Amsterdam   Red Light District: Images of Desire, Galerie Ijburg, Amsterdam 
 1998 Frightful Paint, Arti ef Amicitae, Amsterdam  Drawing the Conclusion, Anna Kustera Gallery, New York

Readings and performances 
5 Minute Performance Olympics, High Performance, Los Angeles, 1984; Anti-Club, Lhasa Club, Los Angeles, 1985; Beyond Baroque, Venice, California, 1985; TV Generations Reading, LACE, Los Angeles, 1986; ABC NO RIO, New York, 1986; Feature, Chicago, and Greathouse, New York, 1988; 6 Women: The Word and the Will, The Knitting Factory, New York, 1989; Brand Name Damages, Brooklyn and elsewhere, 1991;  Newyorican Poets Cafe, 1992; The Banquet, Thread Waxing Space, New York, 1992; Jail of Gender; A Theatrical Adaptation of the Poetry, Prose, and Visual Art of Kathe Burkhart, Cafe Voltaire and Transient Theatre, Chicago, 1994; Bob Flanagan Memorial Reading, Poetry Project, New York, 1996.

References

External links 

 Kathe Burkhart Papers, Fales Library and Special Collections at New York University Special Collections

1958 births
Living people
People from Martinsburg, West Virginia
American women artists
American women poets
American feminists
Artists from West Virginia
Interdisciplinary artists
Poets from West Virginia
Writers from West Virginia
21st-century American women